Eleocharis acicularis is a species of spikesedge known by the common names needle spikerush and least spikerush. It is widespread across Europe, central and southeastern Asia, North America and northeastern South America as far south as Ecuador. It is also found in Australia, where it is probably an introduced species.

Eleocharis acicularis is an annual or perennial spikesedge with long, grasslike stems to about 15 centimeters (6 inches) in height, shorter in bog conditions, from a creeping rhizome. In shallow water it will form short spikes of tiny flowers amongst flat overlapping bracts. The tiny flowers are less than five millimeters in diameter and are borne at the tip of each stem in single, sharply pointed, lanceoloid spikelets up to about six millimeters long. This is a plant of marshes, vernal pools, and bogs.

Eleocharis acicularis is sold commercially as an aquascape plant suitable for inclusion in artificial aquatic environments. It thrives with plenty of light and a high concentration of carbon dioxide.

The specific epithet, is derived from Latin and means "needle-shaped".

Varieties 
Two varieties are recognized:

 Eleocharis acicularis var. acicularis – most of species range
 Eleocharis acicularis var. porcata S.G.Sm. – western North America from Alberta south to New Mexico and Louisiana

References

External links 

 Jepson Manual Treatment
 WetWebMedia: Hair Grass 
 USGS Species Profile
 Washington State Water Quality Program

Acicularis
Flora of North America
Flora of South America
Flora of Europe
Flora of Asia
Plants described in 1753
Taxa named by Carl Linnaeus
Freshwater plants